Mimi Hafida (born 26 August 1965, Batna, Algeria) is an Algerian poet, journalist and visual artist. She received the 2010 Prix Mohammed Dib in Arabic for her collection, "Tales of the Aures"

"Tales of the Aures" is a collection of stories, all related to concerns of children and in particular, their suffering. Hafida has also been a journalist broadcasting on Radio Aurès(fr) in Batna. Hafida is also known as a sculptor, particularly for her work using Safety pins. Her most well known work is an assemblage of safety pins creating a woman.

References 

1965 births
Algerian journalists
Algerian painters
Algerian sculptors
Algerian women painters
Algerian artists
Berber poets
Living people
People from Batna, Algeria
Algerian women sculptors
Algerian women poets
20th-century Algerian poets
21st-century Algerian poets
20th-century Algerian artists
21st-century Algerian artists
Algerian women journalists
21st-century women artists
21st-century Algerian women writers
20th-century Algerian women writers